The Inner and Outer Hebrides off the western coast of Scotland are made up of a great number of large and small islands. These isolated islands are the source of a number of Hebridean myths and legends. The Hebridean Islands are a part of Scotland that have always relied on the surrounding sea to sustain the small communities which have occupied parts of the islands for centuries, resulting in a number of legends relating to the sea local to these islands.

Water spirits

Kelpies 
The kelpie is a shape-shifting water spirit that appears as a horse, but is able to adopt human form. were said to occupy several lochs, including one at Leurbost.
The Kelpie is believed to lure people by their whistle, then ride them into the water and drown them.

Blue men of the Minch
The blue men of the Minch (also known as Storm Kelpies) were said to occupy the stretch of water between Lewis and mainland Scotland, looking for sailors to drown and stricken boats to sink. They look human, but they are blue in colour. They create storms and seek out ships to sink.

Seonaidh (Shoney) 
The  was a Celtic Sea God who took offerings of ale from the inhabitants of Lewis.

Merpeople 
Mermaids are usually unlucky omen, foretelling disaster and often provoking it, often with murderous intent. It has been claimed that there is a mermaid's grave in Benbecula, though the exact location of the purported grave is unknown. According to legend, the mermaid was killed in the early 19th century, after having been sighted for a number of days, after which a teenage boy threw a rock at it, thus killing it. Accounts stated that the upper part of the creature was the size of an infant, while its lower half resembled a salmon.

Mermen are wilder than mermaids, much uglier, and have no interest in humans.

Water monsters

Loch monsters 
 was a lake monster who was said to occupy Loch Suainbhal. Resembling a capsized boat, sightings of it swimming have been reported for one and a half centuries, with local legend being that lambs were once offered annually to it. Other such creatures have been reported in several other lochs, including Loch Urubhal.

At Loch Duvat in Eriskay, while out looking for a horse that escaped his farm in the mist, a farmer reported that he saw what he thought was his missing horse in the loch. As he approached, he realised he was looking at a strange creature which gave an unearthly yell, sending the farmer running home.

Sea monsters 
Various sea monsters have been reported off the shores of Lewis over the years, including a sighting reported in 1882 by a German ship off the Butt of Lewis. Sea serpents have also been reported at the southern side of the island.

Werewolves 
A family of werewolves were said to occupy an island on Loch Langavat. Though reportedly long-dead, legend tells that disturbing their graves would release their spirits.

Will-o'-the-wisp
Will-o'-the-wisps have been reported in the area of Sandwick in Dunrossness, supposedly announcing the approaching death of a local. It is said that their strange lights float around the sea when someone is about to pass.

(fairies) 

The  are thought to be the distorted folk memory of the Iron Age Pictish peoples, who inhabited the Hebrides before they amalgamated into the Gaelic and Viking societies that became dominant after their end.

Appearance 
Like regular men and women, the  sexes differ both in appearance and characteristics.

Most stories about the  describe them as either great beauties or wizened creatures. The  (banshee) (literally "fairy woman") is noted as having no nostrils, webbed feet and long sagging breasts that cannot suckle her young.

Dwelling 
The  in stories are often seen from the entrance of their dwelling having a Ceilidh inside their knolls. Craig Hasten, a castle-like knoll to the south of the village of Baile Mòr in Paible, North Uist, is known locally as a dwelling place of fairies.

Dogs 
On the Isle of Harris a Cu Sith (fairy dog) is said to leave oversized pawprints on the sand that disappear halfway across the beach. It is alleged that this is a fairy hound. In South Uist, a woman walking with two friends in the pitch dark watched as a self-illuminating dog, the size of a collie but with a small head and no eyes, ran towards her. The creature vanished as it bounded past.

Gifts 
One of the heirlooms of the chiefs of Clan MacLeod is the Fairy Flag. Numerous traditions state that the flag originated as a gift from the fairies.

See also 
British folklore
Celtic mythology
Hebrides
History of the Outer Hebrides
Matter of Britain
Rocabarraigh
Scottish mythology

References 

Scottish folklore
Scottish mythology
Isle of Lewis
Celtic mythology